The 2014 African Women's Handball Champions League was the 36th edition, organized by the African Handball Confederation, under the auspices of the International Handball Federation, the handball sport governing body. The tournament was held from October 9–18, 2014 in four venues: Salle Beni Khiar, Salle Hammamet, Salle Nabeul and Salle Zouaoui, in Tunis, Tunisia, contested by 10 teams and won by Clube Desportivo Primeiro de Agosto of Angola.

Draw

Preliminary rounds
Times given below are in CET UTC+1.

Group A

* Note:  Advance to quarter-finals Relegated to 9th place classification

Group B

* Note:  Advance to quarter-finals Relegated to 9th place classification

Knockout stage
Championship bracket

5-8th bracket

9th place

Final standings

See also 
2014 African Women's Handball Cup Winners' Cup

References

External links 
 

African Women's Handball Champions League
2014 in African handball